Tim Rogers (born July 7, 1966) is an American football coach and former player. He served as the head football coach at Kalamazoo College in Kalamazoo, Michigan from 1998 to 2003 and DePauw University in Greencastle, Indiana in 2005, compiling a career college football coaching record of 35–30. Rogers went on to coach high school football at Grand Rapids Catholic Central. In 3 seasons his record was 17-15. Rogers was immediately terminated from his role as a teacher and a Varsity football coach when his severe misappropriation and abuse of funds were discovered by the high school

Head coaching record

References

1966 births
Living people
American football defensive backs
Beloit Buccaneers football players
Cornell Big Red football coaches
DePauw Tigers football coaches
Eastern Michigan Eagles football coaches
Kalamazoo Hornets football coaches
UNLV Rebels football coaches
High school football coaches in Illinois
Junior college football coaches in the United States
Eastern Michigan University alumni
Sportspeople from Chicago
Players of American football from Chicago